The Manchester Trophy is a professional tennis tournament played on outdoor grass courts. It was previously part of the ATP Challenger Tour and now currently part of the ITF Women's Circuit. It is held annually at the Northern Lawn Tennis Club in the Didsbury suburb of Manchester, England, United Kingdom, since 1995. The original defunct tournament, the Manchester Open, began in 1880 and continued until the event became a lower level Challenger tournament in 1995. The Challenger level event ended in 2009, but was revived in 2015. The men's tournament was discontinued after the 2016 edition while the women's tournament was established in 2017.

Past finals

Men's singles

Women's singles

Men's doubles

Women's doubles

External links
The Northern Lawn Tennis Club.: Accessed: 17/09/2011.
Lawn Tennis Association (LTA) official website

 
ATP Challenger Tour
ITF Women's World Tennis Tour
Grass court tennis tournaments
Sports competitions in Manchester
Tennis tournaments in England